Acraea lapidorum is a butterfly in the family Nymphalidae. It is found in Angola.

Taxonomy
It is a member of the Acraea cepheus species group. See also Pierre & Bernaud, 2014.

References

Butterflies described in 1988
lapidorum
Endemic fauna of Angola
Butterflies of Africa